Živković (sometimes transliterated Zivkovic) is a Croatian and Serbian surname derived from a masculine given name Živko.

It is the most common surname in the Šibenik-Knin County in Croatia, and among the most frequent ones in two other counties.

It may refer to:

 Aleksandar Živković (footballer, born 1912), Croatian footballer
 Aleksandar Živković (footballer, born 1977), Serbian footballer
 Andrija Živković (born 1996), Serbian footballer
 Bora Zivkovic Danish footballer
 Boris Živković Croatian footballer
 Borna Živković, Croatian basket player
 Bratislav Živković Serbian footballer
 Denis Zivkovic tennis player
 Đuro Živković Serbian composer
 Milenko Živković Serbian composer
 Miodrag Živković (politician), Montenegrin politician
 Mirjana Živković, Serbian composer
 Nebojša Jovan Živković, Serbian composer
 Ljubica Živković (1936–2017) Serbian chess player
 Petar Živković former Prime Minister of the Kingdom of Yugoslavia
 Richairo Živković, Dutch footballer
 Stevan Živković, Serbian kickboxer
 Tibor Živković, Serbian historian
 Predrag Živković "Tozovac" Serbian folk singer and composer
 Vasa Živković (1819–1891) Serbian poet, cleric, and patriot
 Zagorka Živković, Swedish composer
 Zoran Živković (writer), Serbian writer
 Zoran Živković (politician), former Prime Minister of Serbia
 Zoran Živković (handballer), (born 1945), Serbian handball coach
 Zvonko Živković, Serbian footballer

References

Croatian surnames
Serbian surnames
Slavic-language surnames
Patronymic surnames
Surnames from given names